"ZHARA" Festival is a music festival, which takes place in Azerbaijan, near the coast of Caspian Sea every year. “Zhara” was founded by Grigory Leps, Sergey Kozhevnikov, and Emin Aghalarov. The spectator venue reaches 10 000 spectators at a time. The main audience of the festival are people from Commonwealth of Independent States (CIS) countries. One of the main guests of this festival was Dmitry Peskov, press secretary of the Russian Federation's president.

History of festival 
The first “Zhara” festival was held in Baku, on 9 July 2016.

The second festival was held on 27 July 2017. This time even more CIS stars such as Valeriya, LOBODA, Sergey Lazarev, “Gradusy” band, Timur Rodrigues and others joined the festival.

The third festival was held on 27 July 2018. Special guest Steven Seagal sang in a duet with Emin Aghalarov. Other special guests were: Baskov, singers from Black Star inc. label.

After 3 years of the festival's creation, it was also held in Dubai, UAE.

List of stars in the first festival was:

 A-DESSA
Katya Lel
Zulfiyya Khanbabayeva
Philip Kirkorov
Aleksandr Revva
Vlad Sokolovsky
 Tomas Nevergreen
Polina Gagarina

See also 
 Baku International Jazz Festival
 International World of Mugham Festival

References 

Music festivals established in 2016
Music festivals in Azerbaijan
Summer events in Azerbaijan
2016 establishments in Azerbaijan
Culture in Baku